Danelle may refer to:

Danelle Barrett (born 1967), retired U.S. Navy Rear Admiral
Danelle Bergstrom (born 1957), Australian visual artist
Danelle Gay, Miss Michigan USA
Danelle German, American businesswoman and author
Danelle Im (born 1993), South Korean ice hockey player
Danelle Leverett, member of the JaneDear girls, an American country music duo, with Susie Brown
Stephani Danelle Perry (born 1970), American science fiction and horror writer
Danelle Sandoval, American singer-songwriter
Danelle Tan (born 2004), Singaporean women's football player
Danelle Umstead (born 1972), American alpine skier and Paralympian

See also
Danel
Danell
Danella
Daniele
Daniell
Danielle